Wheeler Boys (born September 22, 1982) is a Canadian professional dirt track and stock car racing driver. He last competed part-time in the NASCAR Camping World Truck Series, driving the No. 50 for Boys Will Be Boys Racing.

Racing career
Boys is from a racing pedigree; his father Trevor Boys and grandfather George Boys have competed in the NASCAR Cup Series. In 1998, he and his father formed Boys Will Be Boys Racing; at the age of 16, Boys began racing mini stock cars at Race City Motorsport Park in Calgary. He later competed in the CASCAR Super Series and NASCAR Nationwide Series before sponsorship issues forced the team to close. Wheeler and Trevor also raced together in various series, including the 2008 NAPA Auto Parts 200 Nationwide race at Circuit Gilles Villeneuve.

After ending his NASCAR career, Boys raced in Alberta's A-1 Autobody Outlaw Legends Dirt Series and has now began a new Alberta Wingless Sprint Car Series called the Iron Aces Sprint Cars. His career includes running wing sprint cars, IMCA Modifieds, late models and GT road race cars. His son Jaxon is also a dirt track racer.

Motorsports career results

NASCAR
(key) (Bold – Pole position awarded by qualifying time. Italics – Pole position earned by points standings or practice time. * – Most laps led.)

Nationwide Series

Camping World Truck Series

West Series

ARCA Re/Max Series
(key) (Bold – Pole position awarded by qualifying time. Italics – Pole position earned by points standings or practice time. * – Most laps led.)

CASCAR

Super Series

References

External links
 

1982 births
NASCAR drivers
Living people
Sportspeople from Calgary
Racing drivers from Alberta
ARCA Menards Series drivers